The following is a list of the MuchMusic Video Awards winners for Best Post-Production.

MuchMusic Video Awards